"Under" is a song by American R&B singer-songwriter Pleasure P. It was released as the third single off his first studio album The Introduction of Marcus Cooper. The song was co-written and produced by Tank and was released on May 10, 2009. The song received two Grammy nominations for Best Male R&B Vocal Performance and Best R&B Song at the 52nd Grammy Awards in 2010.

Music video
The video was released on June 29 2009 on Yahoo! Music. The video features actress Tia Mowry and Draya Michele. It became Pleasure P's first video to top BET's 106 & Park and was ranked #55 on the network's Notarized: Top 100 Videos of 2009 countdown.

Chart performance

Weekly charts

Year-end charts

References

2009 singles
Pleasure P songs
Atlantic Records singles
Music videos directed by Erik White
Songs written by Lonny Bereal
2009 songs